Kristina Sergeyevna Spiridonova (born 21 August 1998) is a Russian freestyle skier who competes internationally.
 
She participated at the 2018 Winter Olympics.

References

1998 births
Living people
Russian female freestyle skiers 
Olympic freestyle skiers of Russia 
Freestyle skiers at the 2018 Winter Olympics 
Sportspeople from Ufa
Universiade silver medalists for Russia
Universiade medalists in freestyle skiing
Competitors at the 2019 Winter Universiade
20th-century Russian women
21st-century Russian women